S Christopher is an Indian scientist who served as Chairman of the Defence Research and Development Organisation (DRDO) 
Formerly he was director of the Centre for Airborne Systems. He is also the author of various research publications. Currently working as professor in Electrical Science Department in India Institute Technology Madras (All India Ranked number one institute by NIRF).

Career
Christopher is credited to have directed the manufacturing of India's first indigenous AEW&C system. He received various  distinguished awards including the Best Defence Research and Development Organisation - Outstanding Scientist for 2012. He was appointed as Chairman of the DRDO on 29 May 2015 for a two-year term. He further got extension of 1year.

Christopher obtained his BE (Hons) in Electronics & Communication Engineering from University of Madras and M.Tech in Microwaves and Radar Engineering from IIT, Kharagpur. He joined IIT Madras, as Project Associate in 1980, and carried out research in Microwave Antenna Design and Near-field Measurement Techniques. He then obtained PhD in Antennae and Measurement Techniques from IIT, Madras. Dr.S.Christopher is the driving force behind the induction of the Indian AEWC system.

References

Living people
People from Nagercoil
Indian aerospace engineers
Defence Research and Development Organisation
Indian Christians
Year of birth missing (living people)
Scientists from Tamil Nadu